Mark Heese (born August 15, 1969) is a Canadian male beach volleyball player.

Born in Toronto, Ontario, Heese began playing beach volleyball at the age of 19 at the Balmy Beach Club in Toronto, and is a graduate of McMaster University where he played university volleyball for the Marauders for four seasons from 1988 to 1992. Partnered with John Child, Heese is a three-time Olympian – bronze medal in Atlanta (1996), 5th in Sydney (2000) and 5th in Athens (2004). He also is a ten-time Canadian National champion winning with John Child (7), Rich Van Huzien (1) and Ahren Cadieux (2).

July 7, 1996 in Berlin, Germany, Heese along with partner John Child won their first FIVB international Open tournament by defeating Para and Marques of Brasil

Stats

References

External links
 Profile at the Beach Volleyball Database
 Heese and partner Ahren Cadieux's website

1969 births
Living people
Canadian men's beach volleyball players
Beach volleyball players at the 1996 Summer Olympics
Beach volleyball players at the 2000 Summer Olympics
Beach volleyball players at the 2004 Summer Olympics
Olympic bronze medalists for Canada
Olympic beach volleyball players of Canada
Olympic medalists in beach volleyball
McMaster University alumni
McMaster Marauders volleyball players
Volleyball players from Toronto
Medalists at the 1996 Summer Olympics